The 1984 UEFA Cup Final was an association football tie played on 9 May and 23 May 1984 to determine the champion of the 1983–84 UEFA Cup. The two-legged final was contested between Anderlecht of Belgium–– who were defending champions–– and Tottenham Hotspur F.C. of England. Tottenham won 4–3 on penalty kicks after the tie finished 2–2 on aggregate.

To date, this remains the most recent European honour won by Tottenham. In addition, it would be another thirty-five years until Spurs even played in another major European final, when they reached the Champions League Final in 2019, losing to Liverpool.

In 1997, it emerged that Anderlecht's passage to the final had involved the club's chairman paying a bribe totalling £27,000 to the referee for the semi-final against Nottingham Forest. A dubious penalty was awarded to Anderlecht, whilst a Forest goal was controversially disallowed.

Route to the final

Match details

First leg

Second leg

See also
1983–84 UEFA Cup
R.S.C. Anderlecht in European football
Tottenham Hotspur F.C. in European football

References

External links
RSSSF

2
Tottenham Hotspur F.C. matches
R.S.C. Anderlecht matches
1984
Uefa
UEFA
UEFA Cup
International club association football competitions hosted by London
International club association football competitions hosted by Belgium
1984 sports events in London
1980s in Brussels
Sports competitions in Brussels
May 1984 sports events in Europe